HMY Iolaire was an Admiralty Yacht that sank at the entrance to Stornoway harbour on 1 January 1919, with the loss of at least 201 men out of the 283 on board. The overcrowded vessel was trying to negotiate a difficult route under exceptionally bad weather conditions. The disaster cost the Isle of Lewis almost the whole of its young male population.

Sinking
His Majesty's Yacht  was an Admiralty yacht, originally named the Amalthaea, and re-named in 1918. She was carrying sailors who had fought in the First World War back to the Scottish Isle of Lewis in the Outer Hebrides. She left the port of Kyle of Lochalsh on the mainland late on the evening of 31 December 1918. At  on New Year's Day, as the ship approached the port of Stornoway, a few yards offshore and a mile away from the safety of Stornoway Harbour, she hit the infamous rocks "The Beasts of Holm" and sank. Those on board would have been able to see the lights of Stornoway. The death toll was officially put at  whom  were islanders but as the ship was badly overcrowded and there was a lack of proper records, the toll could have been somewhat higher.

John F. Macleod from Ness, Isle of Lewis saved  swimming ashore with a heaving line, along which many of the survivors made their way to safety. Only  the  known) passengers survived the disaster; 71% of the people on the yacht died in the incident. The impact of the disaster was devastating to the Islands; 205 passengers were lost, representing almost an entire generation of young men from the Islands.  
 

The sailors were wearing their uniforms including heavy boots, which made swimming from the wreck difficult; many men of that time had never had the opportunity to learn.

An Admiralty enquiry found no satisfactory explanation for the disaster. Its inconclusive findings generated much ill feeling amongst the Lewis population, amidst accusations of a "whitewash". While drunkenness among the crew was discounted at the enquiry, the vessel was sailing at night, in poor visibility and in deteriorating weather. The entrance to Stornoway harbour is not the most straightforward of navigations and it is possible that navigational error was to blame. This hypothesis appears to be supported by the crew of a fishing vessel who noted that Iolaire was not navigating the correct course for entering the harbour.

Memorial
The sinking was one of the worst maritime disasters in British waters during the 20th century. A memorial was erected in 1958 at Holm, outside Stornoway. A stone pillar sticks out of the water at the site of the wreck, which can be seen to starboard as the car ferry approaches the harbour entrance. The community-led commemoration of the centenary was marked in a number of ways including by musicians such as Julie Fowlis and Duncan Chisholm, as well as local artists such as Malcolm Maclean. The disaster has been included in the Arts and Humanities Research Council "Living Legacies (1914-18)" project, led by Abertay University and The Centre for History, University of the Highlands and Islands and the resulting app highlights the nature and extent of the loss felt by families and communities.

A national commemorative service was held at the memorial on 1 January 2019 to mark the centenary of the disaster, attended by First Minister of Scotland Nicola Sturgeon and Prince Charles, Duke of Rothesay, who unveiled a new memorial at Holm which depicts the rope used by John F. MacLeod to save 40 lives.

See also
 List of United Kingdom disasters by death toll

Notes

Footnotes

References

External links
 Ness Historical Society Article (via Archive.org)
Across Two Seas: The sinking of H.M.Y. Iolaire - 1 January 1919
The Independent: New Year's Day 1919: A private tragedy at Lewis
National Library of Scotland: Iolaire: Echoes of a Peacetime Disaster
National Library of Scotland: The Stornoway disaster of 1919
The Scotsman: The Iolaire disaster, where 200 men died yards from shore 
Stornoway Historical Society: Iolaire Disaster 
Virtual Hebrides: Iolaire Disaster
Visualising the Iolaire

Shipwrecks in the Minch
Individual yachts
World War I passenger ships of the United Kingdom
Maritime incidents in 1919
1919 disasters in the United Kingdom
Stornoway
Protected Wrecks of the United Kingdom